Anastacia is the third studio album by American singer Anastacia. It was released on March 29, 2004, by Epic Records. 
Primarily a pop, power pop and rock album, Anastacia also includes elements of soul and R&B. It was a commercial success, peaking at the top of the albums charts in several countries, including Australia, Belgium, Germany, Greece, the Netherlands, Sweden, and the United Kingdom, and becoming one of the top 10 best-selling albums of the year in much of Europe.

The album was never released in Anastacia's native United States, despite plans for an August 30, 2005, release, which was ultimately canceled for unknown reasons. Anastacia promoted the album with television performances and interviews. To further promote the album, Anastacia embarked on the Live at Last Tour in 2004, her first headlining tour.

Background

In January 2003, Anastacia had discovered that she had breast cancer when she was preparing for breast reduction surgery due to orthopedic reasons. Anastacia subsequently established the Anastacia Fund through The Breast Cancer Research Foundation to promote awareness of breast cancer amongst younger women.

After this traumatic experience, Anastacia entered recording studios in September 2003 to record the Anastacia album with Glen Ballard, Dallas Austin, and Dave Stewart for release in 2004. Anastacia was after more of a rock feel on the album, as noted in tracks such as "Seasons Change", "Time", and "I Do" (which features Sonny Sandoval from P.O.D.).

Anastacia explained on her website that her illness made it more difficult to record the album:

"... the experience was not pleasant. I usually look for the bright side of things, but so far nothing about making this record was positive for me. My doctor told me I'd be tired, not stupid. I could not focus on anything. I'd write a verse and then I couldn't write the chorus or I'd write the chorus but couldn't write the bridge. I couldn't talk, I couldn't think straight, I was totally out of it. The doctors said I'd be tired—but of course I had insomnia. It was tough..."

She struggled through the process to finish the album for release in March 2004.

Commercial performance

Anastacia proved to be a huge commercial success, topping the charts in 11 European countries, including Austria, Germany, the Netherlands, Switzerland, Sweden, and the United Kingdom, while reaching number two in Ireland, Italy, Portugal, and Spain. The album's lead single "Left Outside Alone" was equally successful, peaking at number one in Australia, Austria, Italy, Spain, and Switzerland, and reaching the top five in several other countries and on the European Hot 100 Singles chart. The album also spawned another three singles: "Sick and Tired", "Welcome to My Truth", and "Heavy on My Heart". "Sick and Tired" was the most successful of the three, charting inside the top five across numerous European nations, almost matching the success of "Left Outside Alone". "Welcome to My Truth" earned Anastacia her best-selling single ever in Spain and gained moderate European airplay and sales success, while "Heavy on My Heart" fared slightly worse, while proceeds from the single were donated to the Anastacia Fund.

Track listing

Notes
  signifies an additional producer
  signifies a remixer

Charts

Weekly charts

Monthly charts

Year-end charts

Decade-end charts

Certifications

Release history

References

2004 albums
Albums produced by Dallas Austin
Albums produced by Glen Ballard
Albums produced by John Shanks
Albums produced by Patrick Leonard
Albums produced by Ric Wake
Anastacia albums
Epic Records albums
Albums recorded at Henson Recording Studios